The Luigi Broglio Space Center (BSC) located near Malindi, Kenya, is a Italian Space Agency(ASI) Spaceport. It was named after its founder and Italian space pioneer Luigi Broglio. Developed in the 1960s through a partnership between the Sapienza University of Rome's Aerospace Research Centre and the National Aeronautics and Space Administration (NASA), the BSC served as a spaceport for the launch of both Italian and international satellites (1967–1988). The center comprises a main offshore launch site, known as the San Marco platform, as well as two secondary control platforms and a communications ground station on the mainland.  

In 2003, a legislative decree handed management of the center to ASI, beginning in 2004, and the name changed from the previous San Marco Equatorial Range. While the ground station is still in use for satellite communications, the BSC is not currently used as a launch site.

History 
Launches from the platform were controlled from the Santa Rita platform, a second former oil platform located southeast of the San Marco platform, and a smaller Santa Rita II housed the facility's radar. A ground station located on the cape forms the center's primary telemetry site.

The Italian space research program began in 1959 with the creation of the CRA (Centro Ricerche Aerospaziali) at the University of Rome. Three years later, on 7 September 1962, the university signed a memorandum of understanding with NASA to collaborate on a space research program named San Marco (St. Mark). The Italian launch team, trained by NASA, was to first launch a rocket from Wallops Island under NASA supervision and first launch successfully took off on 15 December 1964. The San Marco project was focused on the launching of scientific satellites by Scout launch vehicles from a mobile rigid platform located close to the equator. This station, composed of 3 oil platforms and two logistical support boats, was installed off the Kenya coast, close to the town of Malindi.

The program schedule included three phases:

 Suborbital launches from Wallops Island and the equatorial platform,
 Orbital launch of an experimental satellite from Wallops Island,
 Orbital launches from the equatorial platform.

The San Marco launch platform complex was in use from March 1964 to March 1988, with a total of 27 launches, primarily sounding rockets including the Nike Apache, Nike Tomahawk, Arcas and Black Brant launchers. Low payload weight orbital launches were also made, using the solid-propellant Scout rocket (in its B, D and G subvariants). The first satellite specifically for X-ray astronomy, Uhuru, was launched from San Marco on a Scout B rocket on 12 December 1970.

The ground station is in use and continues to track ASI, ESA and NASA satellites, and Chinese crewed space missions.

However, the two platforms fell into disrepair during the 1990s. Since then, ASI has conducted a feasibility study to reactivate it for the Russian launcher START-1.

Satellite launches

See also 

 San Marco programme
 Luigi Broglio
 Scout
 Italian Space Agency
 Sea Launch

Notes 

 a.  "Nel Marzo 2004, una Delegazione ASI e una Delegazione Russa sono state in visita al Centro Spaziale Luigi Broglio di Malindi, in Kenya, per verificare le condizioni tecniche di riutilizzo della base di lancio, mediante lanciatori russi, di tipo START-1. Il risultato della visita è stato estremamente positivo e le Parti hanno concordato sulla fattibilità di lancio dalle piattaforme marine."

(In March 2004, a delegation from ASI and a Russian delegation went to visit the Luigi Broglio Space Center in Malindi, Kenya, to verify the technical conditions of re-use of the launch site for use by Russian launchers of the type START-1. The result of the visit has been extremely positive and both parties have agreed on the feasibility of launching from the marine platform.)

References

External links 
 San Marco platform at Astronautix
 The San Marco Project Research Centre
  Information on the San Marco platform at Les Fusées en Europe (information in English; dead link, Retrieved 9 October 2008 from Internet Archive, last update in 2006)

Spaceports
Sea launch to orbit
Space program of Italy
Malindi
Transport buildings and structures in Kenya
Transport infrastructure completed in 1964
1964 establishments in Kenya